Larry Wilson (born January 23, 1948) is an American film producer and screenwriter. He is best known for his screenwriting work on the films Beetlejuice (1988) and The Addams Family (1991). He also co-wrote the films The Little Vampire (2000) and, for television, The Year Without a Santa Claus (2006). He wrote and directed a number of episodes of the Tales from the Crypt television series from 1991 to 1996.

References

External links

American film producers
American male screenwriters
American television writers
Living people
Place of birth missing (living people)
American male television writers
1948 births